The Northern Way, also called the Coastal Way, is one of the routes of the Camino de Santiago. This route follows the old Roman road, the Via Agrippa, for some of its way. This route was used in the Middle Ages by Christian pilgrims when Muslim domination had extended northwards and was making travel along the French Way dangerous. It coincides with the E9 European long distance path for most of its route.

The route passes through San Sebastián, Guernica (Biscay), Bilbao, Santander and Gijón (Asturias). It is less populated, lesser known and generally more difficult hiking, because of its changes in elevation, than the French Way. It has also cooler summer weather.

The Liébana Way links the Northern Way with the French Way passing by the Monastery of Santo Toribio de Liébana in Cantabria.

References

Camino de Santiago routes
Hiking trails in Spain